St. Patrick's Festival, Ireland, established by the Government of Ireland in November 1995, is a major tourist attraction, aiming to showcase a modern and creative Ireland, and has since developed into a multi day celebration which takes place annually on and around March 17, St. Patrick's Day - the national holiday of Ireland.

The principle aim of the Festival was to "develop a major annual international event around the national holiday over which the 'owners' of the festival - the Irish people, would stand proud."

References

External links
 St. Patrick's Festival official website

Festivals in Ireland
 
Festival
Spring (season) events in the Republic of Ireland